"Sincerely" is a popular song written by Harvey Fuqua and Alan Freed and first released by The Moonglows in 1954.

The Moonglows recorded the song during their first session for Chess Records, which took place in October, 1954 at Universal Recording Corporation in Chicago. The Moonglows' version reached number one on the Billboard R&B chart and number 20 on the Billboard Juke Box chart.  Co-writing credits were shared by Moonglows band member Fuqua and disk jockey Freed. After it became known that Freed often insisted on songwriter credits for songs by bands he promoted (which partially led to his downfall in a payola investigation years later), Fuqua noted that Freed had in fact contributed to the songwriting for "Sincerely", thus his claim to a songwriting credit in this case was legitimate.

McGuire Sisters cover
The best-selling version of "Sincerely" was a pop cover recorded by the McGuire Sisters, which entered the charts in 1954 and reached number one the next year. It was eventually certified as a gold record.

Other covers
 Pat Boone recorded "Sincerely" as a non-album track and a B-side in 1964.
 In 1988, a cover of the song by the country quartet Forester Sisters reached number eight on the Billboard Hot Country Songs chart.

References

1954 songs
1954 singles
1955 singles
The McGuire Sisters songs
The Forester Sisters songs
Songs written by Harvey Fuqua
Chess Records singles